The face of the giant panda sign, panda sign of the midbrain or double-panda sign is a characteristic "panda's face" appearance in magnetic resonance imaging (MRI) images of people with Wilson's disease. Along with Kayser–Fleischer rings, the sign is helpful in diagnosis.

While the sign is most common in Wilson's disease, it has been rarely reported in acute disseminated encephalomyelitis, rabies encephalopathy, toxic leukoencephalopathy and Leigh syndrome.

References

Further reading

External links
 Radiopedia.org

Symptoms and signs: Nervous system